John Kirkeby or John Kerby (fl. 1441 – 1460s) was a Canon of Windsor from 1455 to 1457 and Master of the Rolls from 1447 to 1461.

Career
Kirkeby was:
Prebendary of St Paul's 1449–1451
Rector of St Pancras Soper Lane 1450–1452
Chaplain to the King
Rector of Langton (diocese of Lincoln) 1457
Prebendary of Lincoln 1456–1462

He was appointed to the eighth stall in St George's Chapel, Windsor Castle in 1455 and held the canonry until 1457.

Notes 

Canons of Windsor
Masters of the Rolls
15th-century English people